Tuberculous gumma is a skin condition characterized histologically by massive necrosis.  Restated, this is a skin condition that results from hematogenous dissemination of mycobacteria from a primary focus, resulting in firm, nontender erythematous nodules that soften, ulcerate, and form sinuses.

See also 
 Tuberculosis verrucosa cutis
 Tuberculosis cutis orificialis
 List of cutaneous conditions

References

External links
 

Mycobacterium-related cutaneous conditions